Mangalgarh is a panchayat village in the Berasia tehsil of Bhopal district, Madhya Pradesh, India.

History 

Mangalgarh was a small Rajput principality in the 17th century, ruled by Raja Anand Singh Solanki. The Pathan mercenary Dost Mohammad Khan provided protection to Mangalgarh. The dowager mother of the Raja had taken a great liking to Dost Mohammad Khan. After the Rajas's death, she appointed him the mukhtar (guardian) of Mangalgarh, around 1708. Dost was tasked with protecting the dowager Rani (queen) and her estate. When the Rajput neighbours of Mangalgarh, led by the Thakur of Parason (now a village in Berasia tehsil), formed an alliance to counter the growing power of the Rani of Mangalgarh, Dost Mohammad Khan defeated them. During his service at Mangalgarh, Dost married a Rajput girl from the Mangalgarh royal family, who later converted to Islam and adopted the name Fatah Bibi (also spelled Fateh Bibi). After the heirless Rani's death, he usurped the principality, which later became the part of his Bhopal State.

Demographics 

According to the 2011 census of India, Mangalgarh has 180 households. The effective literacy rate (i.e. the literacy rate of population excluding children aged 6 and below) is 61.58%.

References 

Villages in Berasia tehsil